This article lists all power stations in Sierra Leone.

Hydroelectric

Thermal power

Solar

See also 
 List of power stations in Africa
 List of largest power stations in the world

References

External links
 Overview of Sierra Leone's Energy Sector In 2013
 RREP Project implemented by UNOPS in Sierra Leone
 Overview of Sierra Leone´s Energy Landscape
 List with all registered Solar Systems in Sierra Leone

Sierra Leone
Power stations